Albert M. Rosenblatt (born January 17, 1936, New York City) is a former associate judge of the New York Court of Appeals.

Education
Rosenblatt attended the University of Pennsylvania, graduating in 1957, and Harvard Law School, where he received his law degree in 1960.

Career as District Attorney and Judge
Rosenblatt served two terms as District Attorney of Dutchess County, New York, from 1969 to 1975.  He then served as a Dutchess County Court Judge until November 1981, when he was elected to New York Supreme Court.  Rosenblatt was New York's Chief Administrative Judge from 1987 to 1989. During his two-year tenure, he created the New York State Advisory Committee on Judicial Ethics. He also established a program for improving court facilities statewide, and established a number of jury reform initiatives including the establishment of the “stand-by” and “call-in” systems to decrease the time prospective jurors spend in the courthouse. He was appointed by Governor George Pataki as an Associate Justice of the New York Supreme Court, Appellate Division, Second Department.  He served on that court from 1989 to 1998.

After Governor George Pataki nominated Rosenblatt to serve on the New York Court of Appeals, the State's highest court, he was confirmed by the Senate on December 17, 1998.  Rosenblatt served as an Associate Judge of the Court of Appeals until December 2006, when he reached the constitutional age limit.

Current positions
Rosenblatt is currently of counsel to McCabe & Mack LLP, in Poughkeepsie, New York.  He also teaches part-time at the New York University School of Law, where he holds the title of Judicial Fellow.

References

Sources
George Marlow, "Albert Martin Rosenblatt" in The Judges of the New York Court of Appeals: A Biographical History (Fordham University Press, 2007).

1936 births
Living people
Lawyers from New York City
20th-century American Jews
University of Pennsylvania alumni
Harvard Law School alumni
New York University faculty
21st-century American Jews